Blessed Sebestyén (died 1007), was a Hungarian Benedictine missionary, prelate and politician, who served as Archbishop of Esztergom between 1002 and 1007.

Biography
According to the legend of Bishop Hartvik, Sebestyén (or Sebastian) was a Benedictine monk of the Abbey of Pannonhalma, who was promoted to the rank of Archbishop of Esztergom by King St. Stephen I of Hungary, after the death of Archbishop Domonkos. For three years he suffered loss of vision, as a result he was replaced by Bishop Anastasius of Kalocsa (or Astrik). In 1005 he was healed, and sanctified the church of the monastery of Pannonhalma. Astrik, on the other hand, was rewarded by the Pope the title of Archbishop of Kalocsa, rising through the ranks the diocese to archdiocese.

The person of Sebestyén is discussed, it is believed he was the same missionary monk, known as Radla, who was a mentor and fellow evangelical work of St. Adalbert of Prague, who lived at the court of Grand Prince Géza since 995. Sebestyén built the chapel of St. Vitus in the castle of Esztergom.

Bibliography 

|-

1007 deaths
Archbishops of Esztergom
11th-century Roman Catholic archbishops in Hungary
Hungarian beatified people
Year of birth unknown
10th-century births
11th-century Hungarian people